The Chisholm Trail Museum in Kingfisher, Oklahoma is a museum that celebrates the Chisholm Trail.  It also incorporates the historic Governor Seay Mansion.  The museum gives a clear timeline of the trail.  Separate from the museum is a life-size statue of Jesse Chisholm, in the middle of downtown.

There are other museums dedicated to the Chisholm Trail in Duncan, Oklahoma (the Chisholm Trail Heritage Center), in Waurika, Oklahoma (the Chisholm Trail Historical Museum), in Wellington, Kansas (also named Chisolm Trail Museum), the Chisholm Trail Museum in Cleburne, Texas, and in Cuero, Texas.

References

External links

 

Museums in Kingfisher County, Oklahoma
Chisholm Trail
History museums in Oklahoma